Ernesto Vela (born 20 October 1968) is a Mexican former swimmer Olympian.

International competition

Summer Olympics 
He competed at two consecutive Summer Olympic Games. The first Games were the 1984 Summer Olympics in Los Angeles, California, United States, as part of the Mexico swimming team. The second Games were the 1988 Summer Olympics in Seoul, South Korea, as part of the Mexico swimming team. No one on the ten member team at Seoul finished above the "heat" stage of competition.

References

1968 births
Living people
Mexican male swimmers
Male backstroke swimmers
Pan American Games competitors for Mexico
Olympic swimmers of Mexico
Swimmers at the 1984 Summer Olympics
Swimmers at the 1987 Pan American Games
Swimmers at the 1988 Summer Olympics
Central American and Caribbean Games gold medalists for Mexico
Competitors at the 1986 Central American and Caribbean Games
Central American and Caribbean Games medalists in swimming
20th-century Mexican people